Jenny Leong (born 1977), an Australian politician, is a member of the New South Wales Legislative Assembly representing Newtown for the Greens since 2015. Leong is the first person to represent Newtown in its current form, as it was created for the 2015 election.

Early life

Leong was born in Adelaide to a Chinese Malaysian father and an Australian mother.  At the age of nineteen she relocated to Newtown where she has lived ever since.

Political career
At university, Leong served as the Sydney University Postgraduate Representative Association President, for 18 months, from February 2006 to July 2007. Leong was elected to the Sydney University Senate in 2007, serving for one year.

She was the Greens candidate for the division of Sydney at the 2004 and 2007 federal elections, but was unsuccessful. Leong also managed the NSW Greens' campaign for the 2013 federal election.

Leong won the newly created seat of Newtown against Labor's candidate, Penny Sharpe, at the 2015 State election. She won with a margin of more than 10 points (two-candidate preferred). She joins Jamie Parker in the lower house of the New South Wales Parliament.

Personal life

Leong was born in 1977, and moved to Newtown in 1996 when she was 19.

Leong worked with Amnesty International for approximately five years from 2008 to 2012, as a crisis coordinator and as a campaign organiser, before entering politics. Although based in London, Hong Kong and Australia, Leong worked all over the world. At Amnesty she oversaw the organisation's response to the Arab Spring, as well as protecting freedom of expression in Burmese elections. She also served over three years on the Human Rights Law Resource Centre advisory committee.

References

 

1977 births
Living people
Australian Greens members of the Parliament of New South Wales
Members of the New South Wales Legislative Assembly
Flinders University alumni
University of Sydney alumni
Australian politicians of Chinese descent
21st-century Australian politicians
Politicians from Adelaide
Women members of the New South Wales Legislative Assembly
21st-century Australian women politicians